Mundial Tour is a concert tour by the reggaeton performer Daddy Yankee, to support his studio album Mundial. The tour contains his first leg ever in Europe as a Headliner Artist and visited the United States, South and Central America.

Tour dates 

Cancelled concerts

Notes

References 

2010 concert tours
2011 concert tours
Concert tours of the United States
Concert tours of South America
Concert tours of Europe
Concert tours of Canada
Daddy Yankee concert tours